Gombeh (also known as Gomeh, Kāgheh, Kambeh, Kameh, and Kūmeh) is a village in Japelaq-e Sharqi Rural District, Japelaq District, Azna County, Lorestan Province, Iran. At the 2006 census, its population was 106, in 23 families.

References 

Towns and villages in Azna County